WCTT (680 AM) is a radio station  broadcasting an adult standards format known as Great 68. Licensed to Corbin, Kentucky, United States.  The station is currently owned by the Eubanks family as part of a quadropoly with CHR/Top 40 station WCTT-FM (107.3 FM), Talk radio station WKDP (1330 AM), and country music station WKDP-FM (99.5 FM). All four stations share studios on Adams Road northwest of Corbin near the intersection of I-75 and US 25E, while WCTT's transmitter facilities are located in the nearby Woodbine community. The station maintains a FM translator: W287DL (105.3 FM). The translator's transmitter is located at the studios on Adams Road.

History
Per the FCC history cards , the station was first licensed on 1400 kilohertz to the local newspaper, the Corbin Times-Tribune.  The transmitter was located 0.7 miles south of the Corbin city limits on US-25 North.   In 1951, the frequency was changed to the current 680 kHz.

In 1960, the license was transferred to Tri-County Broadcasting, and in 1980 to Crawford Enterprises, under the control of Mary Heath Robinson. The WCTT stations were sold to its current owners Encore Communications, Inc in 1995.

As of 1989, the station broadcast a country music format.

According to the FCC ownership reports from 1999 through 2019, the licensee (Encore Communications, Inc) is owned by Eubanks Electrical Supply on South Main Street, which is owned by Dallas and Peggy Eubanks, who are husband and wife.  They also own WKDP (AM) and WKDP-FM, which are licensed  in Corbin.

References

External links

CTT
Adult standards radio stations in the United States
Radio stations established in 1959
1959 establishments in Kentucky
Corbin, Kentucky